Edward Clyde Simonini (February 2, 1954 – September 30, 2019) was an American football linebacker who played seven seasons in the National Football League (NFL) for the Baltimore Colts and New Orleans Saints.

College
Simonini was born in Portsmouth, Virginia, the youngest of five children of Navy Commander Thomas Simonini (1921–2010) and his wife Patricia (1925–1997).

Simonini played college football at Texas A&M under head coach Emory Bellard, and led the Aggies in tackles for three straight seasons. The team went 3-8 during Simonini's freshman year of 1972, but improved to 5-6 in 1973 and 8-3 in 1974. In 1975, Simonini had his best season, leading the team in tackles, and A&M finished 10-2, good enough for 11th in the AP poll. Simonini was also a finalist for the Lombardi Award his final season.

Pro career
In the 1976 draft, the Baltimore Colts selected Simonini in the third round, 81st player selected overall. Selected one pick behind him by the Cincinnati Bengals was Reggie Williams, who went to a long career in the NFL. 1977 would be Simonini's first full season as a starter. He was credited with one interception and three fumble recoveries. The following season, with the NFL now at a 16-game schedule, Simonini started all 16 games. He would not start every game again until 1980. He only appeared in one game for the Colts in 1981, and finished his career that season with the New Orleans Saints. Simonini led the Colts in tackles from 1977-1980.

Throughout his career, Simonini was considered too small to play linebacker in the NFL, even though one of the best linebackers in the NFL, Tom Jackson of the Denver Broncos, was at 5'11" an inch shorter than Simonini. Despite his ability, Simonini was in constant danger of losing his starter role to players bigger and taller. In 1979, Colts head coach Ted Marchibroda informed Simonini that he'd lost his starter role to rookie Barry Krauss. Krauss, a highly touted first-round draft pick, was overmatched, and Simonini quickly regained his starting job. In one of his most memorable games, Simonini made a key stop of New England Patriots quarterback Steve Grogan, sacking Grogan during a roll out, and then on the very next play knocking down a pass to seal the Colts' 31-26 win. In 1981, Simonini broke his collarbone and missed the majority of the season after he tried to return too soon and re-broke the collarbone. In 1981, with the Colts dealing most of their key veteran players, and in a total rebuild mode with new head coach Frank Kush, Simonini requested his release and finished his career in New Orleans. Though he finished his playing career, the Saints traded Simonini to the Miami Dolphins, but he retired before actually playing a down of football with the franchise.

Death
Texas A&M announced that Simonini died of cancer on September 30, 2019. He was married to Karen Christy from December 30, 1978 until his death. Before his death, Simonini was elected to the SEC Football legends class of 2019 and was slated to be honored during a ceremony in December 2019.

References

External links
 Klingaman, Mike. "Catching Up With ... Former Colts middle linebacker Ed Simonini," The Baltimore Sun, Thursday, October 23, 2014.

1954 births
2019 deaths
American football linebackers
Baltimore Colts players
New Orleans Saints players
Texas A&M Aggies football players
All-American college football players
Players of American football from Virginia
Sportspeople from Portsmouth, Virginia